Kurumathur inscription (871 AD), also romanised as Kurumattur, is a mid-9th century inscription from Kurumathur, near Areacode in Kerala, south India. The Sanskrit inscription in Pallava Grantha script is engraved on a loose granite slab from the Kurumathoor Vishnu temple. It is one of the rare Sanskrit inscriptions from Kerala.

The inscription relates to the rule of Chera Perumal king Rama Rajasekhara (9th century AD) in north-central Kerala. It is dated to 24 May 871 AD as a Kali Day chronogram. Composed in shardula-vikridita metre in Sanskrit, the three-stanza inscription states that the king Rajasekhara belonged to the illustrious Ikshvaku dynasty of god Rama. It wishes that king Rajasekhara's glory be spread across the oceans. Further, he is extolled as having ruled the country with justice and never deviated from the Laws of Manu. During his righteous rule twelve Brahmanas constructed a temple pond and also installed an idol of god Vishnu in the temple.

The record was excavated during a renovation of Kurumathoor Vishnu temple (south of Areacode) in February, 2011. The discovery of the inscription was reported by M. R. Raghava Varier.

References 

History of Kerala
Kerala history inscriptions
Chera dynasty
9th-century inscriptions